Athletic Newham Football Club is a football club based in London, England.

History
The club was founded in 2015 as a youth team, then known as Lopes Tavares London, before moving into adult football the following season, joining the Premier Division of the Essex Alliance Football League. They played at the Memorial Recreation Ground in West Ham. They finished eighth in their first season and fifth in 2017–18, before successfully applying to join the new Division One South of the Eastern Counties Football League for the 2018–19 season. On 27 August 2020, the club announced the renaming of the club to Athletic Newham. In 2021, the club were promoted to the Essex Senior League based on their results in the abandoned 2019–20 and 2020–21 seasons.

Ground
The club play at the Terence McMillan Stadium. The stadium has one stand with seats for 192 spectators. The stadium is named after the first Mayor of Newham. The club share the ground with Clapton.

Records
Highest league position: 16th in Eastern Counties League South, 2018–19
Best FA Vase performance: Fifth round, 2021–22

References

External links
Official website

Football clubs in England
Football clubs in London
Association football clubs established in 2015
2015 establishments in England
Sport in the London Borough of Newham
Eastern Counties Football League
Essex Senior Football League